Luo Rufang(1515–1588), also Weide (courtesy name, zì) or Jinxi (art pseudonym, hào), was a Chinese philosopher of the  Ming Dynasty.

Biography 
He was a Neo-Confucian  that was considered heir of the Yang Ming school in Taizhou. He was also an official and educator.

Luo was the student of Yan Jun,who studied from Wang Yangming's first disciple Wang Ji. His student Yang Qiyuan called him "De wu chang shi, shan wu chang zhu".

Thought 
Luo  a new style of Xin Xue, which contained three aspects:
 Seeking Humanity
 Nature heart around the main contents of "Reverting Destiny"
 Six sayings by the Emperor

He is often regarded as the forerunner of Huang Zongxi, Gu Yanwu, and Wang Fuzhi.

References

Sources 

 

1515 births
1588 deaths
Ming dynasty philosophers
Neo-Confucian scholars
Philosophers from Jiangxi
People from Fuzhou, Jiangxi
16th-century Chinese philosophers